The North Branford Center Historic District encompasses the historic town center of North Branford, Connecticut.  Centered at the junction of North Street and Foxon Road, it has been the center of the town's civic and religious life since the early 18th century.  The district includes the town hall, library, Congregational Church, and residential architecture dating to the early days.  The district was listed on the National Register of Historic Places in 1999.

Description and history
North Branford was settled as part of Branford beginning in the late 17th century, and was granted the right to establish a separate Congregational parish in 1717.  It was separately incorporated in 1831.  The town center was established around the site of the first church (replaced in 1830 and again in 1908 by the present Romanesque edifice), and includes its oldest cemetery, where its early ministers are interred.  It remained in essence a small country town center, with its small businesses eventually eliminated by competitive goods and service delivered by railroad.

The only building on the south side of Foxon Road included in the district is the c. 1870 North Branford Hall, built as a school and now housing town offices. All of the buildings in the district are of wood frame construction, except for the Atwater Memorial Library, a brick Colonial Revival structure built in 1943 and enlarged in 1967. It was built on what was originally part of the town green, which is now limited to a triangular portion adjacent to the church. The green dates to 1765, and is where the local militia mustered in the American Revolutionary War.

See also
National Register of Historic Places listings in New Haven County, Connecticut

References

National Register of Historic Places in New Haven County, Connecticut
Historic districts on the National Register of Historic Places in Connecticut
Colonial architecture in the United States
Greek Revival architecture in Connecticut
North Branford, Connecticut